Sebastian Guerra Soto (born July 28, 2000) is an American professional soccer player who plays as a forward for Austrian Bundesliga club Austria Klagenfurt and the United States national team.

Youth career
Soto began his youth career with San Diego Surf, before moving to the Real Salt Lake youth team in 2016. He signed with the University of California, Berkeley to play college soccer but ultimately decided to go pro.

Club career

Hannover 96
In August 2018, Soto joined the youth academy of German club Hannover 96 from Real Salt Lake. Playing in the 2018-19 Under 19 Bundesliga, Soto scored 17 goals in 27 matches for Hannover.
He made his professional debut for the first team in the Bundesliga on April 6, 2019, coming on as a substitute in the 80th minute for Marvin Bakalorz in the 1–3 away loss against VfL Wolfsburg.

Norwich City 
Soto joined Norwich City on July 28, 2020, and signed a three-year deal.

2020–21 season: Loan to Telstar 
In August 2020, Soto joined Dutch side Telstar on loan for the 2020–21 season. Soto made his first start for the club on September 28, 2020, scoring two goals against FC Den Bosch. In January 2021, Soto was recalled by Norwich after having scored 7 goals in just 12 league matches.

2021–22 season: Loans to Porto B and Livingston 
On July 3, 2021, Soto joined FC Porto B on a season-long loan. This loan was terminated mid-season, and on January 26, 2022, Soto joined Scottish Premiership side Livingston on loan for the remainder of the campaign.

2022–23 season: Return to Norwich City 
At the beginning of the 2022–23 season, Soto returned to Norwich City after a brief trial at Barnsley was cut short, with manager Michael Duff citing Soto's failure to report a foot injury in a warm-up game against Crewe.

Austria Klagenfurt 
On August 25, 2022, Soto signed a three-year deal with Austrian Bundesliga side Austria Klagenfurt.

International career

Youth
Soto made his debut for the United States under-19 team in May 2018, scoring five goals in four matches at the 2018 Slovakia Cup, where he won the Golden Boot award as top scorer.

In September 2018, he made his under-20 debut in a friendly match against Jamaica, scoring a brace in the 3–1 win. In November 2018, Soto was added as a replacement player to the United States' squad for the 2018 CONCACAF U-20 Championship. He made two appearances in the tournament, with the US going on to win the title.

On May 27, 2019, Soto scored two goals against Nigeria during the 2019 FIFA U-20 World Cup. He scored another brace on June 4 in the round of 16 match against France.

Soto was named to the team for the 2020 CONCACAF Men's Olympic Qualifying Championship after a postponement in March 2021. The team would fail to qualify for the Olympics.

Senior
In September 2020, Soto was called up by Chile for their 2022 FIFA World Cup qualification matches against Uruguay and Colombia, but he rejected the call-up. Soto was subsequently called up to the senior United States squad in November 2020 by manager Gregg Berhalter for friendly matches against Wales and Panama. Soto made his senior debut for the United States, coming on as a 77th minute substitute and scoring two goals in a 6–2 friendly win against Panama on November 16, 2020.

Personal life
Soto who is the son of a Chilean father and Mexican mother was born in Carlsbad, California.

Career statistics

Club

International

Scores and results list United States' goal tally first, score column indicates score after each Soto goal.

Honors
United States U20
CONCACAF U-20 Championship: 2018

References

External links
 
 
 

2000 births
Living people
Sportspeople from Carlsbad, California
Sportspeople of Chilean descent
Sportspeople of Mexican descent
Soccer players from California
American soccer players
United States men's youth international soccer players
United States men's under-20 international soccer players
United States men's international soccer players
American expatriate soccer players
American expatriate soccer players in Germany
American expatriate sportspeople in Austria

American people of Chilean descent
American sportspeople of Mexican descent
Association football forwards
Hannover 96 players
Bundesliga players
2. Bundesliga players
Norwich City F.C. players
SC Telstar players
FC Porto B players
Livingston F.C. players
SK Austria Klagenfurt players
Eerste Divisie players
Liga Portugal 2 players
United States men's under-23 international soccer players
California Golden Bears men's soccer players